Diary for My Children is a 1984 Hungarian drama film directed by Márta Mészáros. It was entered into the 1984 Cannes Film Festival, where it won the Grand Prix Spécial du Jury. In July 2021, the film was shown in the Cannes Classics section at the Cannes Film Festival.

Cast
 Zsuzsa Czinkóczi as Juli
 Teri Földi as Magda (voice)
 Anna Polony as Magda, Juli nagynénje
 Jan Nowicki as János
 Sándor Oszter as János (voice)
 Mari Szemes as Nagymama
 Vilmos Kun as Nagypapa (voice)
 Pál Zolnay as Nagypapa
 Ildikó Bánsági as Juli anyja
 Éva Szabó - Ilonka as Magda házvezetőnője
 Tamás Tóth as János fia

References

External links
 

1984 films
1980s Hungarian-language films
1984 drama films
Films directed by Márta Mészáros
Hungarian black-and-white films
Hungarian drama films
Cannes Grand Prix winners